A by-election in the seat of Daly in the Northern Territory was held on 11 September 2021, following the resignation of Ian Sloan, the MLA for Daly, on 19 August 2021. Labor candidate Dheran Young won the by-election, taking the seat from the Country Liberal Party. It is the first time in Northern Territory electoral history that an incumbent government has won a seat from the opposition in a by-election.

Candidates

Results

See also

List of Northern Territory by-elections
Electoral results for the division of Daly

References

External links
2021 Division of Daly: by-election (Northern Territory Electoral Commission)
ABC Elections: Daly by-election 2021

Northern Territory by-elections
Daly
2020s in the Northern Territory